This page shows the standings and results for Group A of the UEFA Euro 2012 qualifying tournament.

Standings

Matches
Group A fixtures were negotiated between the participants at a meeting in Frankfurt, Germany, on 21 and 22 February 2010.

Goalscorers

References

Group A
2010–11 in Austrian football
2011–12 in Austrian football
2010–11 in Azerbaijani football
2011–12 in Azerbaijani football
2011–12 in Belgian football
2010–11 in Belgian football
qual
2010–11 in German football
2010–11 in Turkish football
2011–12 in Turkish football
2010 in Kazakhstani football
2011 in Kazakhstani football